This is a list of miscellaneous recurring segments on the children's daytime program, Sesame Street.

Current segments

Elmo

Elmo's World (seasons 30–42, 46–)

Elmo: The Musical (seasons 43–46)

Elmo & Tango's Mysterious Mysteries (seasons 52–)
First aired in season 52, this animated segment shows Elmo and his new puppy Tango solving mysteries around Sesame Street.

Smart Cookies
Aired in season 46. The segments star Cookie Monster as the rookie agent of a team of crime-fighting cookies called "Smart Cookies." His teammates include leader Chipowski, tech-guy Figby and clue-diviner Miss Fortune. In each episode, Cookie Monster learns about self-control and regulation as the team thwarts the dastardly attacks of a villainous baker known simply as "The Crumb." 11 segments were aired from January 16, 2016 to March 18, 2017.

Cookie's Crumby Pictures
Aired in season 44. A new segment about Cookie Monster in movie preview parodies. 15 segments aired over two seasons from September 16, 2013 to June 8, 2015.

Letter of the Day
The "Letter of the Day", or "Cookie's Letter Time", is a segment introduced in 2002. Cookie Monster hosted the segment with cameo appearances by guests for the first two years. The original segments involved a letter written in icing on a cookie, which Cookie Monster tried to stop himself from eating, but invariably ate it. In 2004, Prairie Dawn joined "Letter of the Day"; the segments in this incarnation were almost similar, with a foam letter used instead of an icing one. Segments produced in 2005 involved "The Letter of the Day Games": a game show introduced by an energetic off-camera announcer (voiced by Matt Vogel). In 2007, the Letter of the Day sketches became less common. Starting in 2009, Murray Monster hosts both the Letter and Number of the day segments. A brief clip of this was seen in Sesame Streets 2002-2006 opening sequence.

Starting with season 45, Elmo took the lead of a new song (along with Big Bird, Abby Cadabby, Grover, Bert, Ernie, Cookie Monster, Rosita and Murray Monster), which encouraged viewers as they introduced the letter of the day. A similar version debuted in season 47, lead by Abby Cadabby.

A new version of the song was recorded for Season 50, notably featuring a same lead vocal by Elmo and with Zoe and Rudy replacing Murray in the character lineup.

Number of the Day
The "Number of the Day" segment is hosted by Count von Count. The numbers range from zero to twenty. Initially, the segment was presented with the Count playing his pipe organ; and when he reached the number of the day, balloons, confetti and the number appeared. If the number of the day was zero, the organ disappeared in a puff of smoke. In seasons 36 (2005) and 37 (2006), the number of the day was revealed at a restaurant, with the Count and his girlfriend Countess Dahling von Dahling present. The Count sang a song, asking whether the number of the day was one, two, etc. When he reached the number of the day, the Countess shouted, "STOP!" The segments with the Countess were mainly used for numbers 11-20. Also in seasons 36 and 37, the number of the day was found by using a jack-in-the-box (which was similar to the Numerosity segments used in the show's early seasons), which was mainly used for numbers 1-10, some in season 37 involved the Count interacting with kids, and starting in season 40 Murray Monster hosts both the Letter and the Number of the Day segments. A brief clip of this was seen in Sesame Street'''s 2002-2006 opening sequence.

Starting with season 45, Count von Count took the lead of a new song (along with Big Bird, Abby Cadabby, Elmo, Grover, Bert, Ernie, Cookie Monster, Rosita and Murray Monster), encouraging viewers as they introduced the number of the day. A similar version debuted in season 47, lead by Cookie Monster.

A new song debuted in season 50, lead by Elmo and Abby Cadabby as astronauts in outer space counting Martians.

Cookie Monster's Foodie Truck
Introduced in Season 48, the segments star Cookie Monster and Gonger (from The Furchester Hotel), working in their own food truck and fielding orders from live children via video message. To complete their recipe, the monsters drive the truck to a specific location and learn about where certain foods originally come from. The segment premiered on HBO on November 18, 2017 and has aired 44 episodes so far.

Abby's Amazing Adventures
Introduced in Season 49, the series stars Abby Cadabby and her stepbrother Rudy in animated form. The segment aired from November 17, 2018 to June 24, 2021 and has aired 13 episodes so far.

Big Bird's Road Trip
In the series, Big Bird interviews a child from cities across the United States of America (as well as the occasional international locale). The interviews are presented as video chats back home to Elmo on Sesame Street. Following Big Bird's arrival in California, the segment's format changed to having pre-recorded interviews with children as Big Bird and Elmo watch them back on Sesame Street. This segment aired during Season 50.

I Wonder, What If, Let's Try
The recurring segment highlighted, as the children thinking process in creative playful problem-solving. It was first aired since season 51. 

Celebrating Me, Celebrating You, Celebrating Us!
It was first aired in season 53.

Former segments
Abby's Flying Fairy School
These CGI segments feature fairy-in-training Abby Cadabby. Abby goes to Fairy School, learning from Mrs. Sparklenose. Her class features all new characters: classmates Blögg and Gonnigan, fairies, trolls, and a part-gerbil part-unicorn called Niblet. Episodes of the preschool series are eight to nine minutes long and debuted during Season 40. From Season 40-45, 26 shorts were made from November 10, 2009 to November 6, 2012.

Super Grover 2.0
This title is an upgraded version of Super Grover, a superheroic Muppet who saves the world helping the others. One of the segments has a talking Chicken in the Great Wall of China. Eighteen episodes were aired over seasons 41-45, from September 27, 2010 to February 19, 2015.

What's the Word on the Street?
What's the Word on the Street? first appeared in 2007. Murray Monster hosts the segment which precedes the corporate sponsor spots before each episode. He speaks with people about what the word of the day means and instructs the audience to listen for its usage in the following episode. It was used through season 45. This segment consisted of eight seasons that aired from August 13, 2007 to June 8, 2015.

Great Moments at the Sink
This is a sketch that began in 1996 in which children perform healthy acts (e.g. brushing your teeth, washing your hands, washing your face) near a sink.

The Adventures of Trash Gordon
At the end of most episodes from Season 35–38 (2004–2007), Oscar the Grouch reads Slimey the Worm a chapter of Trash Gordon, a book with over 900 chapters, before going to sleep. It is about a man named Trash Gordon (Gordon) who visits distant planets. At the end, Trash would announce the sponsors of the day.

Hero Guy
Hero Guy was a sketch from 2001–2002. In a series of 11 sketches, Baby Bear brings Hero Guy to life by drawing a picture of him and singing his theme song. These sketches first aired in Season 32, and appeared on occasions until Season 38. When Hero Guy, who is also a bear, springs to life as an animated character, he and Baby Bear embark on adventures together. Although they often face unexpected challenges, Hero Guy never fails to save the day. A brief clip of this was seen in Sesame Streets 2002 opening sequence.

Spanish Word of the Day
The "Spanish Word of the Day" aired in 2002 and remained until 2006. In the segments, a character teaches a Spanish word and its English translation. Usually, the segment features Grover, Rosita, Maria or Gabi. A brief clip of this was seen in Sesame Street's 2002 opening sequence.

Journey to Ernie
"Journey to Ernie" is a game of hide-and-seek. Big Bird must locate Ernie in a box with Ernie's striped shirt and his rubber duckie, but it may not be the first or even the second boxes that Big Bird finds. If Ernie is not in a box, then a sketch or song is featured. Then the game resumes after that segment is played out. When Ernie is found it is followed up by a sketch or song featuring Ernie with or without Bert. 

In 2003, the segment changed with Big Bird looking for clues and finds Ernie in a location that is hinted at in the beginning. This is played out in a complete narrative without any diversions as it was in the first format of "Journey to Ernie." One recurring gag in the second format is Big Bird asking The Two-Headed Monster where Ernie is, with the Two-Headed Monster pointing both left and right. Occasionally, there are surprises. For example, Telly Monster will hide in a triangle, Bert decides to hide instead of Ernie or Big Bird hides and Ernie seeks. At the end, when Big Bird finally discovers Ernie, they sing, and the game ends. In both formats, Ernie is featured in the sketch which follows "Journey to Ernie." A brief clip from Journey to Ernie appears in the 2003-2006 intro.

Despite the popularity of the segment among the younger viewers, according to the book Sesame Street: A Celebration - 40 Years of Life on the Street, the segment was eventually dropped after 2005 because "The look and feel of the animation was too similar to other shows on the television schedule and, while funny, it didn't mesh with the whole show."

Monster Clubhouse
Monster Clubhouse is a recurring Sesame Street segment that debuted during Season 32 featuring energetic young monster friends Mooba, Mel, Narf, and Groogle. For season 33, Mooba was renamed Googel and Groogle was renamed Phoebe. In season 33, the segments were shortened considerably, and the monsters would only do three or four of the activities. They are snack time, furry feeling/shape/animal sound of the day, dance time, nap time, mail time, and getting chased by an elephant. Despite being shown in only two episodes in Season 34 and dropped from the show in Season 35, Monster Clubhouse still appeared in Sesame Street's 2002-2006 intro. 

According to the book Sesame Street: A Celebration - 40 Years of Life on the Street the segment was discontinued after 2003 because, "kids didn't know the new Muppets and became confused, and the frenetic pace of the segment raised concerns. The puppets Mooba, Mel, Narf, and Groogel literally bounced off the walls. So it was abandoned after just two seasons."

Dinner Theatre
Dinner Theatre is a food-themed successor to Monsterpiece Theater, introduced in 2006. The segment remained on the show up until the 2010s. The series parodies plays and films to stress the importance of mealtime and healthy eating habits.

Murray Has a Little Lamb
Introduced during Season 39, this segment feagures Murray and his lamb friend Ovejita visiting different kinds of schools to learn what they do at the school and speak with teachers and students. A song will play before the segment, allowing Murray to wait for his lamb. The lamb will give clues in Spanish; examples include soccer, music, baseball and gymnastics. The title is a play on words of the Mother Goose nursery rhyme Mary Had a Little Lamb.

Monsters in Day Care
Monsters in Day Care was a recurring segment premiering in 1998. Herry Monster visits a real child or group of children at a daycare center. He engages in conversation with the them before heading back to monster daycare to inform the monsters what he learned.

Worms in Space
Worms in Space first aired in 1997, in which Slimey and his fellow WASA astronauts form letters or numbers aboard the Wiggleprise.

Super Morphin Mega Monsters
Super Morphin Mega Monsters was a recurring segment in the 1990s written as a parody of Power Rangers. The characters Elmo-saurus, Zoe-ceratops, Telly-dactyl, and Rosita-raptor would "morph" into caped and helmeted outfits when trouble arose. In contrast to the fight scenes on the real Power Rangers, the Mega Monsters would run around and wave their arms in vaguely martial arts-style motions, but would only reason with others instead of attacking.

Bert and Ernie's Great Adventures

Debuted in Season 39 and hosted by Bert and Ernie in clay animation where they go on various adventures.

Ernie's Show and Tell
Hosted by Ernie where he has kids show him items.

Cecile
These stop-motion musical segments feature a female orange clay ball with a Jamaican accent who sings about the segment's theme, from brushing teeth in western style to about herself. The segments ran from Seasons 22-39 (1990-2008).

Murray's Science Experiments
Hosted by Murray where he performs experiments to help kids learn all about science.

Global Grover
Hosted by Grover by going around the world. He would tell the viewers where he went, followed by a film segment regarding that place. A brief clip from Global Grover appears in the 2003-2006 intro.

Global Grover was also made into a separate 5-minute, 30-episode series in the fall of 2005. It premiered on Playhouse Disney in Asia in 2006.

Monsterpiece Theatre

Mysterious Theatre
Mysterious Theatre was a recurring segment that was introduced in Season 20 (1988-1989) as a parody of Masterpiece Mystery. It is hosted by Vincent Twice Vincent Twice (a parody of Vincent Price). He introduces an episode of The Adventures of Sherlock Hemlock: The World's Greatest Detective, where Sherlock Hemlock and his dog Watson solve crimes and mysteries.

Sesame Street News Flash

Postcards from Big Bird
Hosted by Big Bird who goes to different places from around the world, starting in the late 90s.

Spaceship Surprise
Spaceship Surprise was a recurring segment that was introduced in Season 20 (1988-1989) as a parody of Star Trek.
It features the captain and his friend going to strange planets (such as CH, TR, and SH). There was also the one based on Star Trek: The Next Generation, where the new crew went to the planet H.

Global Thingy
Animated segment about various creatures and their everyday situations, produced by Jim Jinkins and his studio, Cartoon Pizza. The main character, Global Thingy, is a large globe who helps the creatures with their situations.

Here Is Your Life
Here Is Your Life was a recurring segment that was a parody of This Is Your Life. It was hosted by Guy Smiley (and later Sonny Friendly). It shows an object about their life.

Big Bird's Art Gallery
A segment that appears on Season 32 of Sesame Street where Big Bird, mostly accompanied by some of his friends, go to a museum and look at a famous painting.

Camp Wannagohoma
Camp Wannagohoma was a recurring segment where Camp Counselor Grover and the camp kids explored Nature. Anytime Grover gave something the wrong name, the kids would say in unison "NO, IT'S NOT!" and explain what it really was.

Miami Mice
Miami Mice was a recurring segment that was introduced in Season 18 (1986-1987) as a parody of Miami Vice. The segment involves J.P. Mouse and Tito Mouse as they solve crimes and mysteries.

Blue Bird
Blue Bird was a sketch from Season 20 (1988-1989). In a series of two sketches, Big Bird creates a comic book of Blue Bird for his everyday problems. The first sketch was Maria cannot take Big Bird to the Around the Corner playground because she is busy fixing toasters. The other sketch had Bob missing a pair of socks.

Colambo the Detective Sheep
Colambo the Detective Sheep was a recurring segment that features a detective sheep named Inspector Colambo (a parody of Inspector Columbo) on the crimes of Mother Goose and Fairy Tale stories. Segments included The Great Plum Plunder, The Case of the Lost Mittens, The Lost Slipper Caper, etc.

The American Revolution
The American Revolution was a recurring segment on Sesame Street that was introduced in Season 20 (1988-1989). It stars the characters of Sesame Street as people from 1776 when the United States of America was born.

Lifestyles of the Big and Little
Lifestyles of the Big and Little was a recurring segment that was introduced in Season 18 (1986-1987) as a parody of Lifestyles of the Rich and Famous. It is hosted by Dicky Tick (a parody of Robin Leech) as he shows the world about the very very big, and the very very little. Only two skits were made.

What's My Part?
What's My Part? was a recurring segment on Sesame Street that was introduced in Season 1 (1969-1970). It was a spoof of What's My Line? and was hosted by Guy Smiley. Only two skits were made: the Nose and the Foot. However, Guy Smiley continued to appear in other recurring game show segments for many future seasons, such as Name That Sound and Beat the Time.

Primitive
A prehistoric stop-motion series based on the works of Francesco Misseri, starring a different-colored facial haired caveman duo, the somewhat conceited and mischievous brown-haired caveman with two teeth on the top of his mouth (voiced by Eric Jacobson), and his best friend the cheerful and good-natured redhead without teeth and wearing a bone necklace (voiced by Joey Mazzarino). The shorts debuted in 2003 and ran until 2012.

Kid Mural Painting
Skits that first aired in 1997 where young kids paint a giant mural in somebody’s backyard representing and honoring the number of the day in time lapse form. In between, the kids show the number of the day painted either on their hands or on the soles of their bare feet, along with splattering the paint all around each other or on panels of glass just for fun.

Madlenka
An animated short series based on the picture book series by Peter Sis after Global Grover sharing the place with Global Thingy that only debuted in 2004. This series focuses on a 6-year-old girl named Madlenka (voiced by Stephanie D'Abruzzo).

Sneak Peek Previews
Sneak Peek Previews was a recurring segment on Sesame Street that was introduced in Season 15 (1983-1984). It was a spoof of At the Movies'' with Roger Ebert and Gene Siskel. It is hosted by Telly Monster and Oscar the Grouch. Telly gives the movies the "WOW!"s and Oscar gives the movies the "PHOOEY!"s. In one sketch, Ebert and Siskel appeared and showed Telly and Oscar what thumbs up and thumbs down means (thumbs up means that they like the movie and thumbs down means that they do not like the movie).

Suzie Kabloozie
A series of shorts produced by Mo Willems, they featured a young girl named Suzie Kabloozie (voiced by Ruth Buzzi), and her pet cat Feff (also voiced by Buzzi), and would sing about certain subjects like imagination and reading, or announce the Number of the Day. The segments ran from Seasons 26-39 (1994-2008).

Noodles & Nedd
A series of shorts produced by John R. Dilworth and his studio, Stretch Films, that were introduced in Season 29. The shorts follow an eccentric yellow man named Nedd, and his somewhat more intelligent purple cat named Noodles, as they solve their everyday problems.

References